The Midland Football League was a semi-professional football league in England. It acted as a feeder league to the Football League for many years before merging with the Yorkshire League in 1982 to form the Northern Counties East League.

History
Founded in 1889, only one year after the Football League, the Midland League was the second league for professional clubs to be formed. Eleven clubs participated in the first season, 1889–90, four of whom (including the first champions, Lincoln City) would go on to achieve Football League status. The eleven founder members came from six counties.

In the early days of the Midland League, a number of the champion clubs were elected to the Football League, and in return, League clubs who failed to be re-elected were often placed in the Midland League. Lincoln City and Doncaster Rovers both had a number of spells in both the Football League and Midland League.

With the larger professional clubs becoming stronger, they looked to place their reserve side in the Midland League, Derby County being the first in 1894–95. Within less than a decade, more than half of the membership of the Midland League was made up of reserve teams.

Along with most other leagues, the Midland League closed down for the duration of World War I. When football resumed in 1919–20, the Midland League began to take on a different look. Three clubs (Chesterfield, Halifax Town and Lincoln City) joined the Football League when that organisation expanded to form a Third Division North, and the reserve sides of Football League clubs gradually left.  More Midland League clubs progressed to the Football League, e.g. York City in 1929, and Mansfield Town in 1932.

Again, on the outbreak of World War II, the Midland League closed down, and resumed again in peacetime in 1945. After reaching a constitution of 24 clubs in 1946–47, the league entered a decade of stability. Peterborough United won the title for five consecutive seasons from 1955–56 to 1959–60. With most of the remaining Football League clubs reserve sides leaving in 1958, the league was reduced to a rump of just nine clubs, but was saved when the North Eastern League, a competition which had also suffered from the withdrawal of reserve sides, decided to disband, and the Midland League accepted into membership a number of north eastern sides, well to the north of its usual catchment area.

However, this lifeline was to prove short lived. A new league, the Northern Counties League, was formed in 1960 and all the former North Eastern League clubs moved to the new competition. Peterborough United were elected to the Football League (the last Midland League club to achieve this feat), and the Midland League closed down through lack of numbers.

After a single year without a Midland League, a re-formed competition entitled the Midland Counties League was formed, although common practice was still to refer to it as the "Midland League" and it is usually treated as a continuation of the former competition in reference sources. A few of the previous member clubs re-joined, with a number of new members, principally from the Central Alliance. With the formation of the Northern Premier League in 1968, the Midland League lost four of its most successful clubs, but by now the competition was a strong league again and more clubs were looking to join than the league had vacancies. To cater for this, the league formed a second division in 1975–76. This division became "Division One" while the previous clubs formed the "Premier Division". Clubs had to achieve a high level of facilities to join the Premier Division, and in the seven seasons in which the two division format was used, no clubs were actually able to move from the lower to the upper tier.

When senior football in the north of England was rationalised in 1982, the Midland League was one of those affected. The league closed down, merging with the Yorkshire League to form the Northern Counties East League as a feeder league to the Northern Premier League.

Former member clubs

Honours

Election to the Football League
The following clubs (with their league position in brackets) were elected from the Midland League to the Football League -
1891–92 – Burslem Port Vale (3rd)
1892–93 – Rotherham Town (1st)
1893–94 – Burton Wanderers (1st) and Leicester Fosse (2nd)
1894–95 – Loughborough Town (1st)
1895–96 – Gainsborough Trinity (2nd) and Walsall (3rd)
1897–98 – Barnsley (2nd), Burslem Port Vale (5th) and Glossop North End (9th)
1898–99 – Chesterfield (4th)
1900–01 – Doncaster Rovers (2nd)
1903–04 – Doncaster Rovers (11th)
1904–05 – Stockport County (11th)
1908–09 – Lincoln City (1st)
1909–10 – Huddersfield Town (5th)
1910–11 – Grimsby Town (1st)
1914–15 – Rotherham County (1st)
1919–20 – Leeds United (12th)
1920–21 – Lincoln City (1st), Chesterfield (3rd) and Halifax Town (11th)
1922–23 – Doncaster Rovers (2nd)
1928–29 – York City (9th)
1930–31 – Mansfield Town (10th)
1949–50 – Scunthorpe & Lindsey United (3rd) and Shrewsbury Town (10th)
1959–60 – Peterborough United (1st)

League Cup finals

Premier Division
Note - from 1968-69 to 1974-75, this competition was simply called the Midland League Cup.

Division One

References

 
Reserve football leagues in England
Defunct football leagues in England